Magi are followers of Zoroastrianism or Zoroaster.

Magi may also refer to:

People 
 Mägi, a surname
 Andrea Magi (born 1966), Italian boxer
 Magī, or Magy (actor), Japanese actor Kojima Yūichi (born 1972)

Places 
 Mago River (or Magi River), southern Ethiopia
 MAGI, the Moscow complex of TsAGI, the Central Aerohydrodynamic Institute of Russia

Arts and entertainment 
 Magi (film), a 2016 Turkish horror film
 Magi: The Labyrinth of Magic, a Japanese fantasy action adventure manga series

Other uses
 Biblical Magi, the wise men portrayed in Matthew's story of Jesus' nativity
 Magi language (Central Province), Papua New Guinea
 Magi language (Madang Province), Papua New Guinea
 Male accessory gland infection (MAGI), a medical condition
 Modified adjusted gross income, in U.S. Tax Code
 Mathematical Applications Group, Inc., an early computer technology company
 Membrane-associated guanylate kinase, WW and PDZ domain-containing proteins MAGI1, MAGI2, MAGI3

See also 

 Magus (disambiguation)
 Mage (disambiguation)
 Magee (disambiguation)
 Maggi (disambiguation)
 Maji (disambiguation)
 Maghi, a Sikh festival